Frank Anson Richards also known as Frank "Cannonball" Richards and Cannonball Richards (February 20, 1887February 7, 1969) was an American carnival and vaudeville performer whose act involved taking heavy blows to his stomach.

Richards began by letting people (including heavyweight champion Jack Dempsey) punch him in the gut. Dempsey hit him in the stomach a reported total of seventy-five times. He then progressed to letting people jump on his belly, being struck by a two-by-four, being struck by a sledgehammer, and finally being shot by a 104-lb. (47 kg) cannonball from a 12 foot (3.6m) compressed air cannon. Richards limited his cannonball act to twice per day, as performing it more often was too painful.

Early life
Frank Anson Richards was born to Richard Jones Richards and Ellen Elizabeth Richards on February 20, 1887, in Minneapolis, Kansas. He had two siblings, sister Rose May Richards and brother Edwin H. Richards, both of whom would later end up in Long Beach, California as well. Before he became a performer, Richards served in World War I.

Career
Prior to 1924, Richards joined the theatrical world of vaudeville, creating an act for himself by exhibiting how much his stomach could take. These included being hit in the solar plexus with a sledgehammer, battering rams, and allowing people to jump on his stomach. He also allowed champion boxer Jess Willard to punch him in the gut, to prove its strength.

Richards's most famous act involved him being shot in the stomach with a cannonball weighing over one hundred pounds. He performed this act twice a day during the peak of his career, but more than that was too painful.

Personal life
Richards made Long Beach, California his permanent home, despite touring a lot for work.  He was a Christian, a member of the Presbyterian Church of Pomona. As a proud veteran, Richards was a member of American Legion Post 27, and gave free shows at Legion meetings, Elks Clubs, and many military camps during World War II.

Because of his act being centered around getting hit in the gut, he became acquainted with most boxing champions of the time. These included Jim Jeffries, Jack Johnson, Ad Wolgast, Joe Rivers, Joe Lewis, Jess Willard, and Jack Dempsey.

Death

Richards died on February 7, 1969, in Long Beach, California at the age of 81. He was buried at the Pomona Cemetery and Mausoleum in Pomona, California.

In popular culture
A short clip of Richards performing his cannonball trick has become a well-known example of stock footage in popular culture.

In the Freakazoid! episode "The Chip: Part 1", the clip is shown as the character Roddy MacStew says that he has seen many strange things in his lifetime, which include a man being hit in the stomach with a cannonball. It was also used in the 1977 documentary Gizmo!, The Fairly OddParents episode "Fairly OddBaby", and the Chuck episode "Chuck versus the Fear of Death", as well as being referenced in the Seinfeld episode "The Apology".

Richards's cannonball act was parodied in The Simpsons episode "Homerpalooza", where Homer Simpson becomes a carnival freak catching cannonballs, but quits after it is revealed it would kill him to keep going. 

Other uses include a still image from the clip being used for the cover of the album Van Halen III and stuntman Preston Lacy reenacting the trick in the opening to Jackass 3D.

Filmography

Television

See also
Homerpalooza, episode of The Simpsons where Homer portrays a version of Frank "Cannonball" Richards
Human cannonball

References

External links
FRANK 'CANNONBALL' RICHARDS - Punching Bag

 

Sideshow performers
Vaudeville performers
1887 births
1969 deaths
American military personnel of World War I